Việt Trì (越池) is the capital city of Phú Thọ Province in the Northeast region of Vietnam. In 2010, the city had a population of 260,288. Việt Trì is also the economic centre of the province and contains many industrial firms and service industries.

Geography

Geographical position
Therefore Việt Trì is also known as the City of Confluence.

Administrative boundaries
The city borders the three districts of Lập Thạch, Sông Lô and Vĩnh Tường (Vĩnh Phúc Province) to the east, Lâm Thao District to the west,  Ba Vì District (Hanoi) to the south and Phù Ninh District to the north.

Administrative divisions
The city contains 13 wards: Bạch Hạc, Thanh Miếu, Thọ Sơn, Tiên Cát, Nông Trang, Vân Cơ, Bến Gót, Gia Cẩm, Tân Dân, Dữu Lâu, Minh Nông, Minh Phương and Vân Phú, and 10 communes: Thuỵ Vân, Phượng Lâu, Sông Lô, Trưng Vương, Hy Cương, Chu Hoá, Thanh Đình, Hùng Lô, Kim Đức and Tân Đức.

Economy
Việt Trì is one of the first industrial cities of northern Vietnam. The city has great potential for industrial development, agriculture, trade and services. A number of industries are developing including the chemical, paper, and apparel industries. The city focuses on factories, enterprises, and companies with industrial scale production, with a large proportion every year that contributes a large amount of provincial funding and jobs for many workers. A number of factories and companies are located in the district such as:

Việt Trì Paper Factory Maintenance
Red River Steel Plant
Vietnam Chemical Plant Maintenance
CMC tiles factory
Lot River Shipyard
JSC Hanoi-Hong Ha Beer
Company shares rose Aluminum River

Many factories and companies are also located in the industrial zone:

Thuỵ Vân Industrial Park
Đồng Lạng Industrial Park
White Industrial Park
South Vietnamese Accounting Maintenance Industrial Park

Education
University-level colleges - Maintenance in Việt Trì city:

Hùng Vương University (Multi-level universities, multi-disciplinary) including:
Faculty of Mathematics - Technology
Faculty of Economics - Business Management
Faculty of Agriculture - Forestry - Fishing
Faculty of Foreign Languages + Faculty of Social Sciences - Humanities
Faculty of Primary Education - Kindergarten
Faculty of Natural Sciences
Faculty of Music Art
University Preparatory School national central of Việt Trì
Việt Trì University of Industry
College of Pharmacy - Fushico (named University Pharmacy - Fushico in 2012)
Medical College (named Nursing University in 2013)
College of Engineering - Economics
College of Food Industry
College of Mechanical and Electrical
College of Arts and Culture
Red River Intermediate occupations
Provincial Center KTTHHN
Center for continuing education of Việt Trì
secondary education system of Việt Trì city:
Specialist secondary schools Hùng Vương
Việt Trì secondary schools
Nguyễn Tất Thành 

Secondary schools
Việt Trì Industrial's secondary school
Herman secondary school + Việt Trì Engineer's secondary school
Vũ Thê Lang secondary school
Lê Quý Đôn secondary school
Âu Cơ Private schools
Việt Trì Private school
Vân Phú Private school

Health care system
Phú Thọ Provincial Hospital
Hospital Building Corporation Red River
Hospital of Traditional Medicine
Faculty of Occupational Diseases, Hospital of Việt Trì
Việt Trì Textile Maintenance Clinic Hospital
Việt Trì Hospital Engineering
Children's Hospital
Hospital Care and the Rehabilitation
The Board, Department of Health in the Company

Transport and Transportation
Việt Trì's prime responsibility is as an industrial city, due to being located near the confluence of three rivers. The city laid the groundwork for a roots festival in 2015, so in recent years it has undergone infrastructure investment to make sure the it is of fairly uniform construction. Many roads are being renovated, boasting upgrades and new construction to standardized inner city roads to always ensure smooth traffic. Transportation of goods across motorways, railways and rivers is also fairly convenient. National routes 2 and 32 are important for transportation from Việt Trì city to other cities and provinces in Vietnam. In 2012, Việt Trì was designated a class 1 provincial city according to Vietnam's "City Classification Criteria".

Climate

References

External links

Cities in Vietnam
Provincial capitals in Vietnam
Populated places in Phú Thọ province
Districts of Phú Thọ province